Václav Nič is a retired Czechoslovak slalom canoeist who competed from the late 1940s to the early 1960s. He won six medals at the ICF Canoe Slalom World Championships with a gold (C-1 team: 1951), four silvers (C-1, C-2: both 1953, C-2 team: 1949, 1951) and a bronze (Mixed C-2: 1961).

References

Czechoslovak male canoeists
Possibly living people
Year of birth missing (living people)
Medalists at the ICF Canoe Slalom World Championships